Chikandandi Union is a union parishad of Hathazari Upazila of Chittagong District, Bangladesh.

Geography
It is the south-westernmost union of Hathazari Upazila. It borders Fatehpur Union to the north, Dakshin Madarsha and Shikarpur unions to the east, Chittagong to the south, and Sitakunda Upazila to the west.

Population
According to the 2011 Bangladesh census, Chikandandi Union had 9,012 households and a population of 47,573, none of whom lived in urban areas.

References

Unions of Hathazari Upazila